Marshall of Heldorado is a 1950 American Western film.

Plot

Cast
James Ellison as James "Shamrock" Ellison
Russ "Lucky" Hayden as Russ "Lucky" Hayden
Raymond Hatton as The colonel
Fuzzy Knight as Deacon
Betty Adams as Ann
Tom Tyler as Mike Tulliver
George Lewis as Nate Tulliver
John Cason as Jake Tulliver
Stanley Price as Marshal
Stephen Carr as Razor Tulliver
Dennis Moore as Doc Tulliver

References

External links

Marshall of Heldorado at TCMB

1950 films
American Western (genre) films
Films directed by Thomas Carr
1950 Western (genre) films
Lippert Pictures films
American black-and-white films
1950s English-language films
1950s American films